Gary Evan Stevenson (born August 6, 1955) is an American religious leader and former businessman who is a member of the Quorum of the Twelve Apostles of the Church of Jesus Christ of Latter-day Saints (LDS Church).  He served previously as the church's Presiding Bishop and was the fourteenth man to serve in that position. He has been a general authority of the church since 2008. Stevenson was appointed to the Quorum of the Twelve Apostles in October 2015. Currently, he is the twelfth most senior apostle in the church.

Stevenson was born in Ogden, Utah, and was raised primarily in the state's Cache Valley area. Stevenson was an LDS Church missionary in the Japan Fukuoka Mission in the mid-1970s. After this, he attended the Jon M. Huntsman School of Business at Utah State University (USU).

Prior to his call as a general authority, Stevenson worked as the chief operating officer of ICON Health & Fitness. He has also served on the Marriott School of Management National Advisory Council and the Utah State University Foundation Board.

LDS Church service
In the LDS Church, Stevenson has served as a bishop and a counselor in a stake presidency. He served as president of the Japan Nagoya Mission from 2004 to 2007.

Stevenson became a member of the LDS Church's First Quorum of the Seventy at the April 2008 general conference. During his time in the Seventy, Stevenson served both as a counselor and as president of the church's Asia North Area, based in Tokyo, Japan. On March 31, 2012, he was released from the First Quorum of the Seventy and sustained as the church's Presiding Bishop. Stevenson was released as presiding bishop six days after he was sustained to the Quorum of the Twelve and was succeeded by Gérald Caussé.

In October 2015, he was sustained as an apostle and member of the Quorum of the Twelve. As an apostle, he is accepted by the church as a prophet, seer and revelator. He was sustained to the Quorum of the Twelve along with Ronald A. Rasband and Dale G. Renlund, filling vacancies created by the 2015 deaths of L. Tom Perry, Boyd K. Packer and Richard G. Scott. This was the first time since 1906 that three new apostles were sustained. They are the 98th, 99th and 100th members of the Quorum of the Twelve Apostles in the church's history. Stevenson is currently assigned over the church's southeast Africa area, comprising the countries of Uganda, Rwanda, Kenya, Zimbabwe, South Africa, Madagascar and Seychelles.

Personal life
Stevenson married Lesa Jean Higley in the Idaho Falls Idaho Temple and have four sons. He met his wife while attending USU.

Additional reading
Church News, June 28, 2008, p. 7
"Elder Gary E. Stevenson", Liahona, May 2008, p. 138
"Bishop Gary E. Stevenson", Liahona, May 2012.
Robert D. Hales, "Elder Gary E. Stevenson: An Understanding Heart", Liahona, June 2016.

References

External links
General Authorities and General Officers: Elder Gary E. Stevenson

1955 births
American general authorities (LDS Church)
American Mormon missionaries in Japan
Living people
Presiding Bishops (LDS Church)
Members of the First Quorum of the Seventy (LDS Church)
Mission presidents (LDS Church)
Businesspeople from Ogden, Utah
Utah State University alumni
20th-century Mormon missionaries
21st-century Mormon missionaries
Apostles (LDS Church)